Countess Marie Festetics von Tolna (20 October 1839 – 16 April 1923), was an Austro-Hungarian countess, diarist and lady-in-waiting.

Family
Born in Tolna, Hungary, into an old and distinguished House of Festetics, she was the fifth child and fourth daughter of Count Sandor Festetics von Tolna (1805–1877) and his wife, Baroness Josephine von Boxberg (1811–1892).

Imperial Lady-in-waiting
She served as lady-in-waiting to Empress Elisabeth of Austria from 1870, and became one of the favorites and confidantes of the Empress. Her diaries are regarded as an important source of the Imperial Austrian court. She was also a noted diarist.

References
Gudula Walterskirchen, Beatrix Meyer (Hrsg.): Das Tagebuch der Gräfin Marie Festetics. Kaiserin Elisabeths intimste Freundin. Residenz-Verl. St. Pölten 2014, .
Beatrix Meyer: Kaiserin Elisabeth und ihr Ungarn. Allitera. München 2019, ISBN 978-3-96233-130-6.

1839 births
1923 deaths
Austrian ladies-in-waiting
Women diarists